Britt-Marie Ellis (born 13 October 1958) is a Swedish sports shooter. She competed at the 1988 Summer Olympics and the 1992 Summer Olympics.

References

External links
 

1958 births
Living people
Swedish female sport shooters
Olympic shooters of Sweden
Shooters at the 1988 Summer Olympics
Shooters at the 1992 Summer Olympics
Sportspeople from Norrköping
20th-century Swedish women
21st-century Swedish women